David Gardner may refer to:

 David M. Gardner (born 1981), Nevada State Assemblyman
 David Gardner (cricketer) (born 1940), former English cricketer
 David Gardner (fiddler) (born 1968), Scottish fiddle performer, teacher, and judge
 Dave Gardner (footballer) (fl. 1897), Scottish footballer
 David Gardner (The Motley Fool), co-founder of The Motley Fool, established in 1993
 David Gardner (trade unionist) (died 1913), Scottish trade unionist
 David P. Gardner (born 1933), president of the University of California and also president of the University of Utah
 Dave Gardner (ice hockey) (1952–2023), Canadian ice hockey centre
 Dave Gardner (basketball) (born 1964), British former basketball player
 Brother Dave Gardner (1926–1983), American comedian and singer
 David Gardner, vocalist and guitarist of Engerica

See also
 David Gardiner (disambiguation)